The 2008–09 United Counties League season was the 102nd in the history of the United Counties League, a football competition in England.

Premier Division

The Premier Division featured 19 clubs which competed in the division last season, along with two new clubs, promoted from Division One:
Daventry Town
Rothwell Corinthians

League table

Division One

Division One featured 14 clubs which competed in the division last season, along with two new clubs, relegated from the Premier Division:
Kempston Rovers
Wootton Blue Cross

League table

References

External links
 United Counties League

9
United Counties League seasons